Acraga citrinopsis is a moth of the family Dalceridae. It is found in Venezuela, Brazil, Peru and Bolivia. The habitat consists of tropical moist, tropical dry, tropical premontane moist, subtropical moist and warm temperate moist or dry forests.

The length of the forewings is 8–10 mm for males and 14 mm for females. Adults are whitish with a yellow tinge, the dorsal forewings are slightly more yellow than the pale hindwings. Adults are on wing year-round.

The larvae feed on Ricinus communis.

References

Dalceridae
Moths described in 1927